Olynthus is a Neotropical genus of butterfly in the family Lycaenidae.

References

External links
 Images representing Olynthus at Consortium for the Barcode of Life

Eumaeini
Lycaenidae of South America
Lycaenidae genera
Taxa named by Jacob Hübner